Montesquieu-Volvestre is a commune in the Haute-Garonne department of southwestern France.

Population

Notable people
 Stella Blandy (1836-1925), woman of letters, feminist

See also
Communes of the Haute-Garonne department

References

Communes of Haute-Garonne